Camburzano is a comune (municipality) in the Province of Biella in the Italian region Piedmont, located about  northeast of Turin and about  southwest of Biella.

Camburzano borders the following municipalities: Graglia, Mongrando, Muzzano, Occhieppo Inferiore, Occhieppo Superiore.

References

Cities and towns in Piedmont